Mohamed El Makrini (born 6 July 1987) is a Dutch professional footballer who plays as a midfielder for SV TEC.

Career
Born in Utrecht, El Makrini started his youth career at SV CDW in Wijk bij Duurstede, after which he moved to USV Elinkwijk. At USV, he stood out among the scouts of FC Den Bosch, who brought him to their academy. As a youth, he mostly played in attacking midfield. After his transfer to Den Bosch, El Makrini was labeled as a big talent, which earned him a professional contract at a young age. As a result, he was invited to the Morocco national under-20 team. El Makrini played for FC Den Bosch for six seasons, in which he made more than 130 appearances, including matches in the KNVB Cup tournament, league playoffs and the league. After moving to the first team of Den Bosch, he was utilised as a right back, midfielder and right winger. In his last year at FC Den Bosch, El Makrini played mostly in defensive midfield.

In the summer of 2011, El Makrini signed a one-year contract with SC Cambuur. With the club, he won the second-tier Eerste Divisie championship in the 2012–13 season and thus achieved promotion to the Eredivisie. There, he made 32 league appearances during the 2013–14 season. His stay at Cambuur eventually lasted four seasons. 

On 1 July 2015, El Makrini moved to Danish Superliga club OB, signing a two-year contract. In the Superliga, El Makrini also made an impact. In January 2017, he was signed by Dutch side Roda JC Kerkrade for a transfer fee of €150,000. In his first six months at the club, they suffered relegation from the Eredivisie. El Makrini remained in Kerkrade despite the relegation and played one season in the second tier.

On 9 July 2019, El Makrini moved to Scottish Premiership club Kilmarnock on a one-year contract. He scored his first goal for the club on 14 September 2019, in a 2–0 home win against Hibernian. A year later, El Makrini signed for Norwegian club IK Start.

Honours

Club
SC Cambuur
Eerste Divisie: 2012–13

References

External links
 
 
 Mohamed El Makrini at OB

1987 births
Living people
Dutch footballers
Dutch expatriate footballers
USV Elinkwijk players
FC Den Bosch players
SC Cambuur players
Odense Boldklub players
Roda JC Kerkrade players
Kilmarnock F.C. players
IK Start players
Eredivisie players
Eerste Divisie players
Danish Superliga players
Scottish Professional Football League players
Footballers from Utrecht (city)
Dutch sportspeople of Moroccan descent
Association football midfielders
Expatriate men's footballers in Denmark
Expatriate footballers in Scotland
Expatriate footballers in Norway
Dutch expatriate sportspeople in Denmark
Dutch expatriate sportspeople in Scotland
Dutch expatriate sportspeople in Norway